Forlidas Pond is a round frozen pond,  in diameter, lying in a morainal valley east of the north end of Forlidas Ridge, Dufek Massif, Queen Elizabeth Land, Antarctica. The only pond in the northern Pensacola Mountains, it is of much interest to biologists. The pond was discovered and briefly investigated in December 1957 by a United States – International Geophysical Year party from Ellsworth Station. The name is in association with Forlidas Ridge and was suggested by Arthur B. Ford of the United States Geological Survey following geological work in the area, 1978–79.

Antarctic Specially Protected Area
The site is protected under the Antarctic Treaty System as Antarctic Specially Protected Area (ASPA) No.119.

References 

Lakes of Antarctica
Bodies of water of Queen Elizabeth Land
Antarctic Specially Protected Areas